Danville is an independent city in the Commonwealth of Virginia. The city is located in the Southside Virginia region and on the fall line of the Dan River. It was a center of tobacco production and was an area of Confederate activity during the American Civil War, due to its strategic location on the Richmond and Danville Railroad. In April 1865 it briefly served as the final capital of the Confederate States before its surrender later that year.

Danville is the principal city of the Danville, Virginia Micropolitan Statistical Area. As of the 2020 census, the population was 42,590. It is bounded by Pittsylvania County, Virginia and Caswell County, North Carolina to the south. It hosts the Danville Otterbots baseball club of the Appalachian League.

Danville had an African American majority during the Reconstruction era and had African American political representatives of the Readjuster Party until after the Danville Massacre and Democrats regaining control locally and statewide. The area again saw violence during the civil rights era.

History

18th century

Numerous Native American tribes had lived in this part of the Piedmont region since prehistoric times. During the colonial period, the area was inhabited by Siouan language-speaking tribes.

In 1728, English colonist William Byrd headed an expedition sent to determine the true boundary between Virginia and North Carolina. Late that summer, the party camped upstream from what is now Danville. Byrd was so taken with the beauty of the land, that he prophesied a future settlement in the vicinity, where people would live "with much comfort and gaiety of Heart." He named the river along which they camped as the "Dan", for Byrd felt he had wandered "From Dan to Beersheba."

After the American Revolutionary War, the first settlement developed in 1792 downstream from Byrd's campsite, at a spot along the river shallow enough to allow fording. It was named "Wynne's Falls", after the first settler. The village developed from the meetings of pioneering Revolutionary War veterans, who gathered annually here to fish and talk over old times.

In 1793, the state General Assembly authorized construction of a tobacco warehouse at Wynne's Falls. This marks the start of the town as "The World's Best Tobacco Market", Virginia's largest market for brightleaf tobacco. The village was renamed "Danville" by an act of November 23, 1793. A charter for the town was drawn up February 17, 1830, but by the time of its issue, the population had exceeded the pre-arranged boundaries. This necessitated a new charter, which was issued in 1833. In that year, James Lanier was elected the first mayor, assisted by a council of "twelve fit and able men". By the mid-19th century, William T. Sutherlin, a planter and entrepreneur, was the first to apply water power to run a tobacco press. He became a major industrialist in the region.

19th century

Several railroads reached Danville, including the Richmond and Danville Railroad (completed 1856), and the Atlantic and Danville Railway (completed 1890). These enabled the export of Danville's manufacturing and agricultural products. The major growth in industry came in the late 19th century, after the war. The Southern Railway, successor to the Richmond and Danville, built a grand passenger station in Danville in 1899, which is still in use by Amtrak and is a satellite facility of the Virginia Museum.

At the outbreak of the Civil War, Danville had a population of some 5,000 people. During those four years of war, the town was transformed into a strategic center of Confederate activity. Local planter and industrialist William T. Sutherlin was named quartermaster of its depot, the rail center was critical for supplying Confederate forces, and a hospital station was established for Confederate wounded.  A network of batteries, breastworks, redoubts and rifle pits defended the town.

A prison camp was set up, with the conversion of six tobacco warehouses, including one owned by Sutherlin, for use as prisons. At one time they held more than 5,000 captured American soldiers. Malnutrition and dysentery, plus a smallpox epidemic in 1864, caused the death of 1,314 of these prisoners. Their remains have been interred in the Danville National Cemetery.

The Richmond and Danville Railroad was the main supply route into Petersburg, where Lee's Army of Northern Virginia was holding the defensive line to protect Richmond. The Danville supply train ran until General Stoneman's Union cavalry troops tore up the tracks. This event was immortalized in the song, "The Night They Drove Old Dixie Down".

In 1865, Danville hosted the Confederate government. Confederate President Jefferson Davis stayed at the mansion of William T. Sutherlin from April 3 to 10, 1865, and the house became known as the last "Capitol of the Confederacy". Here he wrote and issued his last Presidential Proclamation. The final Confederate Cabinet meeting was held at the Benedict House (since destroyed) in Danville. Davis and members of his cabinet left the city when they learned of Lee's surrender at Appomattox, and moved to Greensboro, North Carolina, making their way south. On the day they left, Governor William Smith arrived from Lynchburg to establish his headquarters here.

In 1882, the biracial Readjuster Party had gained control of the city council, causing resentment and even alarm among some white residents, even though the council was still dominated by white members; the city had a majority African-American population. The Readjuster Party had been in power at the state level since 1879. Violence broke out on November 3, 1883, a few days before the election, when a racially-motivated street fight turned to shooting after a large crowd gathered; five men were killed, four of them black. A local Danville commission found African Americans at fault for the violence on November 3, but a US Senate investigation decided that white residents were to blame. No prosecution resulted from either inquiry.

In the late 19th and continuing into the early 20th centuries, tobacco processing was a major source of wealth for business owners in the city, in addition to the textile mills. Wealthy planters and owners built fine houses, some of which have been preserved.

Given the falls on the river, the area was prime for industrial development based on water power. On July 22, 1882, six of Danville's residents (Thomas Benton Fitzgerald, Dr. H.W. Cole, Benjamin F. Jefferson and three brothers: Robert A., John H., and James E. Schoolfield) founded the Riverside Cotton Mills, making use of cotton produced throughout the South. Both the Riverside Cotton Mills and Danville itself grew tremendously during Fitzgerald's leadership of the company as President. In its day it was known nationally as Dan River Inc., the largest single-unit textile mill in the world.

As the industrial town grew rapidly, it attracted many single workers, and associated gambling, drinking, and prostitution establishments. By the early 20th century, the city passed laws against gambling, but it continued in small, private places.  On September 9, 1882, Danville Mayor John H. Johnston shot and killed John E. Hatcher, his chief of police. Hatcher had demanded an apology for a statement Johnston had made regarding unaccounted fine money. Johnston was charged with murder, but he was acquitted at trial. The Southern "culture of honor" was still strong and jurors apparently believed the killing was justified.

The Southern Railway constructed a railroad line to the city in the late 19th century and had facilities here, which contributed to the growing economy. In 1899, the company completed a grand passenger station, designed by its noted architect Frank Pierce Milburn. For many years, passenger traffic was strong on the railroad; it also operated freight trains.

20th century

Danville Massacre

A serious train wreck occurred in Danville on September 27, 1903. "Old 97", the Southern Railway's crack express mail train, was running behind schedule. Its engineer "gave her full throttle", but the speed of the train caused it to jump the tracks while on a high trestle crossing the valley of the Dan River. The engine and five cars plunged into the ravine below, killing nine and injuring seven. The locomotive and its engineer, Joseph A. ("Steve") Broadey, were memorialized in song. A historic marker at the train crash site is located on U.S. 58 between Locust Lane and North Main Street. A mural of the Wreck of the Old 97 has been painted on a downtown Danville building to commemorate the incident.

Afterward Democrats forced African Americans out of office and suppressed their voting rights. In November 1883 Democrats regained control of the state legislature by a large majority, and pushed out the Readjuster Party.

White Democratic legislators interpreted the Danville events as more reason to push blacks out of politics. In 1902, the state legislature passed a new constitution that raised barriers to voter registration, effectively disenfranchising most blacks and many poor whites, who had been part of the Readjuster Party. They excluded them from the political system, causing them to be underrepresented and their segregated facilities to be underfinanced.

On July 15, 1904, the Danville police successfully broke up a lynching party by firing warning shots above a crowd. About 75 white men had gathered at the jail to take Roy Seals, an African-American man arrested as a suspect in the murder of a white railroad worker. The police saved Seals and the city quickly indicted some of the lynch mob; several men were convicted, fined and served 30 days in jail. The killer was found to have been another white man, who was prosecuted.

On March 2, 1911, Danville Police Chief R. E. Morris, who had been elected to three two-year terms and was running for a fourth term, was arrested as an escaped convicted murderer. He admitted that he was really Edgar Stribling of Harris County, Georgia. He had been on the run for thirteen years.

On October 13, 1917, Walter Clark was lynched. He was an African-American man who had fatally shot a policeman while resisting arrest for the killing of his common-law wife. Clark held off the police for two hours, but a mob gathered and set his house on fire. He was shot multiple times and killed as he left the house. His was the last lynching in Danville.

Heightened activism in the civil rights movement in Virginia occurred in Danville during the summer of 1963. Since the early 20th century, most blacks had been excluded from voting by the state constitution, which had created barriers to voter registration. White Democrats had imposed legal segregation after regaining control of the state legislature following the Reconstruction era, and Jim Crow laws maintained white supremacy. On May 31, representatives of the black community organized as the Danville Christian Progressive Association (DCPA), demanding an end to segregation and job discrimination in the city. They declared a boycott of white merchants who refused to hire blacks and marched to City Hall in protest of conditions.

Most of the marchers were high school students. Police and city workers, armed with clubs, beat the young protesters and sprayed them with fire hoses. Around forty protesters needed medical attention, but the marches and other protests continued for several weeks. Reverend Martin Luther King Jr., leader of the Southern Christian Leadership Conference (SCLC), came to Danville and spoke at High Street Baptist Church about the police brutality. He said it was the worst he had seen in the South. The date of one protest on June 10, 1963, later came to be referred to as "Bloody Monday".

The Student Nonviolent Coordinating Committee (SNCC) sent organizers to Danville to support the local movement. They helped lead protests, including demonstrations at the Howard Johnson Hotel and restaurant on Lee Highway. The hotel was known for discriminating locally against blacks as customers and excluding them as workers. A special grand jury indicted 13 DCPA, SCLC, and SNCC activists for violating the "John Brown" law. This law, passed in 1830 after a slave uprising, made it a serious felony to "...incite the colored population to acts of violence or war against the white population." It became known as the "John Brown" law in 1860 because it was used to convict and hang abolitionist John Brown after his raid on Harpers Ferry in 1859.

By the end of August, more than 600 protesters had been arrested in Danville on charges of inciting to violence, contempt, trespassing, disorderly conduct, assault, parading without a permit, and resisting arrest. Because of the large number of arrests on these charges, often the jails were overcrowded, and protesters were housed in detention facilities in other nearby jurisdictions. The demonstrations failed to achieve desegregation in Danville at that time. Town facilities remained segregated until after passage of the Civil Rights Act of 1964. African-American residents were mostly unable to register and vote until after the federal government enforced their constitutional rights under the Voting Rights Act of 1965.

Since the late 20th century, the textile industry has moved to offshore, cheaper labor markets. The Dan River mill has closed and many of its buildings have been torn down, with the bricks sold for other uses. "The White Mill" of the Dan Mill complex, considered historically and architecturally significant, is being renovated in the early 21st century as an apartment complex.

In the late 20th century, the restructuring of the tobacco, textile, and railroad industries all had an adverse effect, resulting in the loss of many jobs in Danville. The decline in passenger traffic caused the Danville railroad station to fall into disuse. It was listed on the National Register of Historic Places in 1995, and has been renovated by a combination of public and private funding. Today part of the station devoted to the first satellite facility of the Science Museum of Virginia. Related spaces have been developed for a park with amphitheater, a community meeting and recreation facility, and the Danville Farmer's Market. The city used ISTEA funds in association with the Virginia Department of Transportation, and partnered also with Amtrak, Pepsi-Cola, and other private sources. The station renovations were completed in 1996. This project spurred investment in other warehouse properties, "which have been redeveloped into offices, commercial spaces, apartments, lofts, and restaurants. The approximately $4 million of federal grant money initiated the redevelopment and leveraged additional funds from public and private sources."

21st century
The city and region continue to work to develop new bases for the economy. The losses have made it difficult to preserve the city's many architecturally and historically significant properties dating from its more prosperous years. In 2007 Preservation Virginia President William B. Kerkam, III, and its Executive Director Elizabeth S. Kostelny announced at a press conference held in Danville at Main Street Methodist Church that the entire city of Danville had been named as one of the Most Endangered Historic Sites in Virginia. It is working to preserve and redevelop the River District as a center for the community and to stimulate heritage tourism.  In 2020, the city approved a referendum to open a Casino at the site of the old mill, which is slated to open in 2024.

Geography
U.S. Route 58 leads east  to South Hill and west  to Martinsville.

Climate
Danville has a humid subtropical climate (Köppen Cfa). Winter nights usually average below freezing, with air frosts being abundant during that season. During summer, it is influenced by the strong sun and convective air masses, providing both hot temperatures and frequent thunderstorms.

Demographics

2020 census

Note: the US Census treats Hispanic/Latino as an ethnic category. This table excludes Latinos from the racial categories and assigns them to a separate category. Hispanics/Latinos can be of any race.

2010 census
As of the census of 2010, Danville had a population of 43,055. The racial makeup of the city was White Non-Hispanic 46.7%, African American 48.3%, Hispanic 2.9%, Asian 0.9%, American Indian or Alaska Native 0.2%, and two or more races 1.3%.

25.4% of the population never married, 46.6% were married, 5.4% were separated. 11.6% were widowed and 11.0% were divorced.

Economy

Businesses
 Sovah Health - Danville 
 Goodyear
 Nestlé
 Swedwood, a subsidiary of IKEA, opened its first factory in the U.S. in this city, in 2008. It employed more than 300 people but closed in December 2019.
Morgan Olson

Arts and culture

River District
Prior to the recession of 2008, the City of Danville and its partners began a major project focused on the revitalization of the Historic Downtown and Tobacco Warehouse districts, now coined "The River District." The project continues with a new momentum as the public sector has joined the movement. See Danville River District.

Garland Street and historic districts

Millionaire's Row has many homes built in the late 19th and early 20th centuries by successful tobacco planters, who gained their wealth in this commodity crop.  The mansions are in an area of many street trees and often have their own well-developed landscaping.

The entire area of Penn's Bottom, the nickname for the part of Main Street that was developed as the first suburb of Danville during the tobacco boom of the late 19th century, has been designated as a historic district. Other recognized historic districts include The Old West End, Tobacco Warehouse, Downtown Danville, Holbrook–Ross Street, and North Main.

Also located in this district is the "Sutherlin Mansion", now used as the Danville Museum of Fine Arts and History. This Italianate mansion was the plantation home of Major William T. Sutherlin, a major tobacco processing industrialist, banker, politician, and Confederate quartermaster. In April 1865, he offered his mansion to President Jefferson Davis and his cabinet as the site of the last "Capitol of the Confederacy" after the fall of Richmond. The museum and its grounds occupy a block in this district. In the late 19th century, Sutherlin's surrounding plantation was subdivided and developed to create the surrounding residential neighborhood.

Churches
Danville is known as "the city of churches" because it has more churches per square mile than any other city in the state of Virginia.

Shopping
Danville Mall, formerly Piedmont Mall, opened in 1984.

Government

Municipal
Danville has a council–manager government in which a city manager is hired by council to supervise the city government and ensure that the ordinances and policies made by the city council are carried out in an effective manner. The city council consists of nine members elected from single-member districts representing residents. The city council selects the mayor and vice mayor from among its members to serve two-year terms. The city council has the power "to adopt and enforce legislative and budgetary ordinances, policies, and rules and regulations necessary to conduct the public's business and to provide for the protection of the general health, safety and welfare of the public."

Sports
The Danville Braves were a minor league baseball team in Danville from 1993 to 2020. They competed in the Appalachian League as a farm team of the Atlanta Braves. The Braves played their home games at American Legion Field. In conjunction with a contraction of Minor League Baseball beginning with the 2021 season, the Appalachian League was reorganized as a collegiate summer baseball league, and the Braves were replaced by the Danville Otterbots in the revamped league designed for rising college freshman and sophomores.

Education

Elementary and high schools 
 Galileo Magnet High School
 George Washington High School
 Piedmont Governor's School for Mathematics, Science, and Technology
 O.T. Bonner Middle School
 Westwood Middle School
 Woodrow Wilson Intermediate School
 E.A. Gibson Elementary School
 Forest Hills Elementary School
 G.L.H. Johnson Elementary School
 Park Avenue Elementary School
 Schoolfield Elementary School
 Woodberry Hills Elementary School

Private schools
 Westover Christian Academy
 Sacred Heart Catholic School

Colleges and universities
 Averett University
 Danville Community College
 Danville Regional Medical Center School of Health Professions

Media

Newspapers
 Chatham Star Tribune
 Danville Register & Bee

Magazines
 Evince
 Showcase Magazine

Radio
 WAKG (103.3 FM)
 WBTM (102.5 FM)
 WDVA (1250 AM)
 WMPW (105.9 FM), branded as MoreFM
 WWDN (104.5 FM)

Television
Danville is served by television stations in the Roanoke/Lynchburg television market.
 WSET-TV, ABC, affiliate based in Lynchburg
 WSLS-TV, NBC, affiliate based in Roanoke
 WDBJ, CBS, affiliate based in Roanoke 
 WFXR, Fox, affiliate based in Roanoke 
 WWCW, CW affiliate based in Lynchburg
 WPXR-TV, ION, affiliate based in Roanoke 
 WMDV-LD, an independent television station owned by the Martinsville, VA-based Star News Corporation
Danville was once the home of WDRL-TV 24, a station that was an affiliate of the WB and United Paramount Network before changing ownership from 2007 to 2014. Today, it is known as WZBJ, a sister channel of WDBJ and is owned by Gray Television.

Infrastructure

Transportation

Railroad
Amtrak's Crescent train connects Danville with the cities of New York, Philadelphia, Baltimore, Washington, Charlotte, Atlanta, Birmingham and New Orleans. The Amtrak station, built in 1899 by Southern Railways, is situated at 677 Craghead Street.

Highways
U.S. Route 58 (Riverside Dr/River St) parallels the north bank of the Dan River traveling east–west through Danville's main commercial district while the US 58 Bypass route bypasses the city's center to the south via the Danville Expressway. U.S. Route 29 splits into a business route and a bypass at the North Carolina/Virginia border. The business route enters the heart of Danville via West Main Street and Memorial Drive and exits via Central Boulevard and Piney Forest Road; US 29 Business travels relatively north–south. The bypass (future Interstate 785) takes the eastern segment of the Danville Expressway and rejoins the business route north of the city near Chatham, Virginia.

U.S. Route 360, which connects Danville with Richmond, enters the city from the east concurrent with U.S. Route 58 (South Boston Road), continuing along U.S. Route 58 Business at the Danville Expressway interchange, and terminating at the North Main Street intersection just north of downtown.

U.S. Route 311 in 2013 was expanded from North Carolina to terminate just outside Danville's western limits at U.S. Route 58.

North Carolina Highway 86 becomes State Route 86 once it crosses the state line into Danville as South Main Street. It continues north to its terminus at US 29 Business/Central Boulevard.

State Route 293 was created in 1998 to mark the route of old US 29 Business, which was rerouted to the west. SR 293 enters Danville's downtown historic district as West Main Street, then Main Street, and then crosses the Dan River to meet US 29 Business as North Main Street.

State Route 51 parallels US 58 Business as Westover Drive from its western terminus at US 58 Business at the Danville's corporate limits to its eastern terminus at US 58 Business near the Dan River.

Airport
The city is also served by Danville Regional Airport.

Notable people

 Nancy Astor, Viscountess Astor (born Nancy Langhorne), elected as member, British House of Commons
 Barry Beggarly, Short track race car driver
 William Lewis Cabell, Confederate brigadier general and mayor of Dallas
 Buddy Curry, Atlanta Falcons player
 Jon Dalton, reality television personality (also known as Johnny Fairplay)
 Wendy Dascomb, Miss Virginia USA 1969 and Miss USA 1969
 Terry Davis, former NBA professional basketball player
 Frederick Delius, classical music composer, 1885–1886
 Ferrell Edmunds, NFL player
 Robert H. Edmunds Jr., North Carolina Supreme Court justice
 Tremaine Edmunds, NFL player
 Blind Boy Fuller, blues guitarist and vocalist, street performer in Danville
 Lee E. Goodman, former Chairman, U.S. Federal Election Commission
 Emmet Gowin, photographer
 J. Hartwell Harrison, M.D., instrumental in the world's first kidney transplant
 Richard Benjamin Harrison, star of the reality television series Pawn Stars.
 John B. Henderson, U.S. Senator from Missouri
 Jules James, Vice Admiral, U.S. Navy, during World War II; awarded the French Legion of Honour
 Richard Jewell (born Richard White; 1962–2007), police officer and security guard who became a hero in connection with the Centennial Olympic Park bombing at the 1996 Summer Olympics in Atlanta, Georgia
 George M. La Monte, paper manufacturer, politician, philanthropist
 Teresa Lewis, a murderer who was the first woman executed by lethal injection in Virginia
 Margaret Livingstone, neurobiologist and professor at Harvard Medical School
 Henry Lumpkin Wilson, physician in Atlanta who served as Confederate army chief physician, later known as real estate developer and investor, local politician, drug retailer
 Ralph Lowenstein, journalism professor and dean of the University of Florida College of Journalism and Communications
 Percy Miller Jr., first black baseball player in the Carolina League
 Jim Mitchell, NFL player (defensive end, Detroit Lions 1970–1977), Virginia State University football player
 Herman Moore, NFL player, University of Virginia football player
 Johnny Newman, NBA player
 Mojo Nixon, psychobilly musician and Sirius Satellite Radio host
 Eric Owens, former Major League Baseball player
 Timothy Peters, NASCAR racecar driver
 Nate Poole, NFL player
 Tony Rice, bluegrass musician
 James I. Robertson Jr., historian, professor of history at Virginia Tech
 Gregory L. Robinson, director of the James Webb Space Telescope
 Wendell Scott, first African-American NASCAR driver
 Peyton Sellers, NASCAR driver
 Clarence Edward Smith, better known by his assumed names Clarence 13X and Allah,  The Nation of Gods and Earths founder
 Charles Stanley, former president of Southern Baptist Convention, senior pastor of First Baptist Church Atlanta, and founder and president of In Touch Ministries
 Skipp Sudduth, actor (Ronin and Third Watch)
 William T. Sutherlin, planter, industrialist and politician; the first to apply steam power to tobacco hydraulics press, founder and president of Bank of Danville, hosted President Jefferson Davis and his cabinet for last week of the Confederacy government
 Don Testerman, professional football player
 Charles Tyner, actor (Sweet Bird of Youth (play) and Cool Hand Luke)
 Ricky Van Shelton, country music singer
 Camilla Ella Williams, opera singer, first African American contracted to sing with New York City Opera
 Andra Willis, singer on The Lawrence Welk Show
 David Wilson, football player for the New York Giants
 Tony Womack, Major League Baseball player

In popular culture
"It's a mighty rough road from Lynchburg to Danville" are lyrics in "Wreck of the Old 97" a song memorializing the September 27, 1903, event that became arguably the most famous train wreck in U.S. history. The Richmond and Danville Railroad, referenced as "the Danville train," is also referenced in the popular folk-style song "The Night They Drove Old Dixie Down".

See also 
 National Register of Historic Places listings in Danville, Virginia

References

Sources
 "Danville, Virginia". City-Data.com. Retrieved July 11, 2012.

Further reading
 Calhoun, Walter T. "The Danville Riot and Its Repercussions on the Virginia Election of 1883." In Studies in the History of the South, 1875–1922, edited by Joseph F. Steelman et al., 25–51. Greenville, North Carolina: East Carolina College, 1966.
 Dailey, Jane. "Deference and Violence in the Postbellum Urban South: Manners and Massacres in Danville, Virginia." Journal of Southern History 63, no. 3 (August, 1997): 553–590.

External links

 City of Danville official website

 
Capitals of former nations
Cities in Virginia
Danville, Virginia micropolitan area
Southwest Virginia